Joel E. Tabora  (born September 26, 1947) is a Filipino Jesuit priest and the incumbent president of the Ateneo de Davao University. He demonstrated a commitment to "whole person formation", social justice, and spirituality as well as defined social justice as equal distribution of resources and opportunities. Tabora committed to rule of law, true meaning of fairness, work ethics, dignity of labor, and rights of workers.

Education 
He graduated in Leopold-Franzens University, Innsbruck, Austria, and Ateneo de Manila University. He finished the course Philosophy and mainly focuses on Karl Marx.

Early career 

Before he became president of the Ateneo de Davao University, Tabora served as president of the Ateneo de Naga University from 1999 to 2011.

In the early years of his career, Joel Tabora was an instructor at the Ateneo de Manila University, Rector of the San Jose Seminary (1989-1995) and became President of Loyola School of Theology (1994-1999).

Activity 
He serves as a trustee at Xavier University (Cagayan de Oro City), Ateneo de Zamboanga University, Catholic Ministry for Deaf People, Philippine Jesuit Foundation, Catholic Educational Association of the Philippines (CEAP) and Davao Association of Catholic Schools (DACS-CEAP XI). He is also the president of the Association of Jesuit Colleges and Universities in Asia Pacific(AJCU-AP). He also serves as President of Philippine Accrediting Association of Schools, Colleges and Universities(PAASCU).

Views on Reproductive Health Bill 
As the Advocacy chair of the Catholic Education Association of the Philippine, Joel Tabora supports Bishops in opposing any law that includes provisions for "abortifacient" birth regulation, which forces Catholics "to act against his or her conscience" and "usurps" parents the right to educate their children on sexuality, but not everyone in there is Catholic in a "Plural" society people should have to come together and understand what is the demand of common good. Joel Tabora points out that Reproductive health should be a product of negotiation and open communication with one another.

References
http://www.addu.edu.ph/university-president/
http://www.rappler.com/nation/11424-why-catholic-teachers-can-back-rh

External links

20th-century Jesuits
21st-century Jesuits
1947 births
People from Manila
Living people
University of Innsbruck alumni
Ateneo de Manila University alumni
Scholars of Marxism